The Kurtis Kraft 500B, 500C, 500F, and 500G, are a series of open-wheel race cars, designed, developed and built by Kurtis Kraft, for AAA and U.S.A.C. Indy car racing, between 1948 and 1960. It was also notably the last front-engined car to win the Indianapolis 500, in 1964.

References

Indianapolis 500
American Championship racing cars
Open wheel racing cars